The  Roman triumph (Latin triumphus) was a celebration for a victorious military commander in ancient Rome. For later imitations, in life or in art, see Trionfo.  Numerous later uses of the term, up to the present, are derived directly or indirectly from the Roman one.

Triumph may refer to:

Geography
 Triumph, Idaho
 Triumph, Illinois
 Triumph, Louisiana
 Triumph Township, Custer County, Nebraska
 Triumph Township, Warren County, Pennsylvania
 Triumph, Guyana

Business
 Triumph (TWN), a defunct German motorcycle manufacturer
 Triumph Cycle Co. Ltd., a British bicycle brand
 Triumph Engineering Co Ltd, a defunct British motorcycle manufacturer
 Triumph Group, an aerospace manufacturing and repair company
 Triumph Hotels, an American collection of hotels
 Triumph International, a worldwide underwear manufacturer
 Triumph Motor Company, a British car manufacturer 
 Triumph Motorcycles Ltd, a current British motorcycle manufacturer 
 Norton Villiers Triumph, a defunct British motorcycle manufacturer

Books
 Triumph (magazine), a defunct Catholic publication
 Triumph (Nigeria), a Nigerian English language newspaper
 Triumph (comics), a former Justice League member
Triumph (novel), 1993 alternate history novel by Ben Bova set at the end of World War II

Film and TV
 Triumph Studios, a computer game development company based in the Netherlands
 Triumph Films, a division of Sony Pictures Entertainment
 Triumph (1917 film), a 1917 film starring Lon Chaney, Sr.
 Triumph (1924 film), a 1924 film directed by Cecil B. DeMille
 Triumph (2021 film), a 2021 film directed by Brett Leonard
 Triumph (upcoming film), an upcoming film directed by Kristina Grozeva and Petar Valchanov
 Triumph of the Will, 1935 Nazi propaganda film
 Triumph the Insult Comic Dog, a character from the television show Late Night with Conan O'Brien
 Triumph (Rome), a 2005 episode of the television series Rome

Music
 Triumph (band), a Canadian hard rock band

Albums
 Triumph (Triumph album), their 1976 eponymous first album
 Triumph, alternative (UK) title of Triumph's second (first international) album Rock and Roll Machine
 Triumph (The Jacksons album), 1980
 Triumph (Philip Bailey album), 1986
 Triumph (Circle (Finnish band) album), 2008

Songs
 "Triumph" (song), a 1997 rap single by the Wu-Tang Clan

Transport
 Triumph automobiles: Triumph TR3, Triumph TR4, Triumph TR6, and Triumph TR7
 Carnival Triumph, a cruise ship
 , a ferry owned by Seatruck Ferries
 Triumph (sternwheeler), a sternwheel steamboat that ran on the Nooksack River in the 1890s
 HMS Triumph
 USS Triumph (disambiguation)
 USNS Triumph (T-AGOS-4)

Other
 a scuppernong (large muscadine Vitis rotundifolia) cultivar
 Triomphe, a trick-taking 15th century card game
 BC Triumph Lyubertsy, a Russian basketball team

See also
 Triumf (disambiguation)
 Trionfo, a form of festivity in Renaissance Italy